Calverton is a hamlet and census-designated place (CDP) on eastern Long Island in Suffolk County, New York, United States. The population was 6,510 at the 2010 census.

Most of Calverton is in the Town of Riverhead, while the area south of the Peconic River is a mostly undeveloped smaller portion in the Town of Brookhaven.

History
Calverton was first referred to as "Baiting Hollow Station" when the Long Island Rail Road arrived in 1844. The station closed in 1958, but the sheltered shed for the station remained standing as of 2007.

The area's Native American name was Conungum or Kanungum, meaning "fixed line" or "boundary". In 1868, the Calverton post office opened, named for Bernard J. Calvert. It remained a small farming community specializing in cranberries, which grew in swampy areas along the Peconic River until the Navy purchase.

Calverton's history is tied closely to Naval Weapons Industrial Reserve Plant, Calverton. In 1953, the United States Navy purchased  around Calverton from a local farmer named Harry Edwards, including the mansion of a grandson of Frank Winfield Woolworth's, so that Grumman could test and finish jets. A  runway was built, and most of Grumman's F-14 Tomcat and E-2C Hawkeye aircraft were to pass through the plant.

In 1965, Nelson Rockefeller proposed using the base as the fourth major airport for the New York metropolitan area. Grumman and local opposition ended the quest.

In 1995, after Northrop acquired Grumman, the new Northrop Grumman pulled out of the base, and the Navy began liquidating the land. In 2000, Skydive Long Island (formerly located at East Moriches) moved to the airport, and to this day continues to generate the majority of the current air traffic as a key destination for New York-based skydivers.

In January 2008, the Riverhead Town Board, with newly elected officers, signed a deal to sell the airport for $155 million to Riverhead Resorts, to build the ski mountain, tear up the airport runway, and replace it with a lake, overruling a December vote to give the NASCAR track the go-ahead. It would have taken up to three years to get the necessary environmental permits, and the proposed opening date of the project was 2012. On November 12, 2010, however, the town of Riverhead voted 4-1 to cancel all plans for the indoor ski resort/water park.

A portion of the base is being developed as an industrial/office park.

Several new medium size industrial companies have sprung up in the area, including Crown Recycling and a Federal Express Distribution Center.

Geography

The former Naval Weapons Industrial Reserve Plant became the Naval Weapons Industrial Reserve Plant, Calverton (IATA code "CTO") in the late 20th century.

Demographics

As of the census of 2000, there were 5,704 people, 2,539 households, and 1,518 families residing in the CDP. The population density was 203.7 per square mile (78.7/km2). There were 2,735 housing units at an average density of 97.7/sq mi (37.7/km2). The racial makeup of the CDP was 86.61% White, 7.66% African American, 0.46% Native American, 0.95% Asian, 0.04% Pacific Islander, 2.03% from other races, and 2.26% from two or more races. Hispanic or Latino of any race were 6.07% of the population.

There were 2,539 households, out of which 22.3% had children under the age of 18 living with them, 46.1% were married couples living together, 10.1% had a female householder with no husband present, and 40.2% were non-families. 34.7% of all households were made up of individuals, and 19.9% had someone living alone who was 65 years of age or older. The average household size was 2.24 and the average family size was 2.88.

In the CDP, the population was spread out, with 20.3% under the age of 18, 5.6% from 18 to 24, 27.5% from 25 to 44, 20.9% from 45 to 64, and 25.6% who were 65 years of age or older. The median age was 43 years. For every 100 females, there were 93.0 males. For every 100 females age 18 and over, there were 88.0 males.

The median income for a household in the CDP was $36,544, and the median income for a family was $44,342. Males had a median income of $40,184 versus $33,047 for females. The per capita income for the CDP was $26,609. About 6.5% of families and 10.2% of the population were below the poverty threshold, including 13.1% of those under age 18 and 6.6% of those age 65 or over.

Economy 
Splish Splash Water Park is located within the hamlet.

Media
 WPTY is licensed to serve Calverton

See also 
 Calverton National Cemetery

References

External links

 Newsday History

Riverhead (town), New York
Brookhaven, New York
Hamlets in New York (state)
Census-designated places in New York (state)
Census-designated places in Suffolk County, New York
Hamlets in Suffolk County, New York